The 1587 siege of Kagoshima took place during Japan's Sengoku period, and was the last stand of the Shimazu family against the forces of Toyotomi Hideyoshi. This was the final battle in Hideyoshi's campaign to take Kyūshū.

Following the Shimazu defeat at Sendaigawa, the Shimazu then retreated to their home castle of Kagoshima. Hideyoshi's forces numbering roughly 60,000, then made a landing, having set off from Akune. Under the leadership of Hashiba Hidenaga, Fukushima Masanori, Katō Kiyomasa, and Kuroda Yoshitaka, they then surrounded the city. The land-based divisions, which were not on the boats from Akune, had traversed the volcanic valleys defending the city with the help of local monks.  In the end, however, negotiation precluded any fighting.

References

See also
Bombardment of Kagoshima (1862)

Kagoshima 1587
1587 in Japan
Conflicts in 1587